The Bright Orange Years is a 1985 record from the band Volcano Suns.

The alternative title to "Truth Is Stranger Than Fishing" was "Nietzsche's Nuts".

In 2009, the album was remastered by engineer Bob Weston and reissued by Merge Records with bonus tracks.

Track listing
All songs written by Peter Prescott unless otherwise noted.

Personnel 

Lou Giordano – engineer
Volcano Suns – producer
Peter Prescott – drums, vocals
Jeff Weigand – bass, vocals, photography
Jon Williams – guitar, vocals

References

1985 debut albums
Volcano Suns albums